Chauncey Golston (born February 10, 1998) is an American football defensive end for the Dallas Cowboys of the National Football League (NFL). He was drafted by the Cowboys in the third round of the 2021 NFL Draft. He played college football at Iowa.

Early years
Golston attended East English Village Preparatory Academy. He contributed to the team qualifying for the state playoffs in three straight years. As a junior, he tallied 53 tackles and 13 sacks, while receiving honorable-mention all-city honors. 

As a senior, he posted 43 tackles and 9 sacks, while receiving first-team all-state, all-metro and all-city honors.

College career
Golston accepted a football scholarship from the University of Iowa. As a redshirt freshman, he was a backup at defensive end and totaled 2 tackles.

As a sophomore, he appeared in all 13 games as a key reserve player, collecting 35 tackles (9 for loss), 3.5 sacks, 3 quarterback pressures, one interception, one pass breakup and 3 fumble recoveries (led the team). He had 3 tackles and one sack against the University of Minnesota. He made 5 tackles and one sack against Northwestern University.

As a junior, he was named a starter at defensive end for all 13 games in the team's 4-3 defense. He recorded 47 tackles (9.5 for loss), 3 sacks, 7 quarterback pressures, one interception and 5 pass break-ups. He had 8 tackles (2 for loss), one sack and 2 quarterback pressures against the University of Michigan. He made 8 tackles (1.5 for loss) and one sack against Penn State University.

As a senior in 2020, the football season was reduced to 8 games due to the COVID-19 pandemic. He started all 8 games at defensive end, registering 45 tackles (8.5 for loss), 5.5 sacks, 3 quarterback pressures, one interception, one forced fumble and one pass breakup. He had 7 tackles (1.5 for loss), a shared sack and one quarterback pressure against Northwestern University. He made 6 tackles (2 for loss) and 1.5 sacks against Michigan State University. He had 4 tackles (2 for loss), one sack and one interception against Penn State University. He made 8 tackles and one sack against the University of Illinois.

Professional career

Golston was selected by the Dallas Cowboys in the third round (84th overall) of the 2021 NFL Draft. Golston signed his four-year rookie contract with Dallas on July 21, 2021.

References

External links
Iowa Hawkeyes bio

1998 births
Living people
Players of American football from Detroit
American football defensive ends
Iowa Hawkeyes football players
Dallas Cowboys players